The A260 is a Russian federal highway. It runs from Volgograd to the Ukrainian border, where it continues as the M30 to Dnipro.

As M21, it was part of the Soviet trunk road network and started from Chișinău via Dnipro to Volgograd. In 2010 the section in Russia received the number A260, but the M21 designation was used until the end of 2017, when the A260 designation became official. The entire route is part of E40 and AH70.

References

Roads in Russia
Transport in Volgograd Oblast
European route E40